Survivor România 2023  is the  fourth season of the Pro TV incarnation of the competitive reality TV show Survivor România, which commenced airing on 9 January 2023.

Production

Development
Like previous seasons, this fourth season is produced by Acun Media Global. The season was first announced on  September 29, 2022. A press release for the show's renewal confirmed that Daniel Pavel would return as a host. Casting began also on September 29, 2022. Online applications opened upon the start of casting and closed on November, 2022. On December 23, 2022, it was announced that the season would premiere on January 9, 2023.

Wildcard
The first member of Războinicii tribe was chosen by a public vote. On 10 October, it was announced that the public would decide the first castaway  of the series and the vote was opened for the viewers to choose between four women and four men. The casting was open from 24 October to 1 December.

Contestants
Andreea Moromete was chosen by fans. The Faimoșii tribe was announced by Pro TV on December 15, 2022. Notable cast included kickboxing champion, Ionuț Iftimoaie, former elite gymnast Ștefania Stănilă and Silicon Valley's youngest self-made millionaire, Sebastian Dobrincu. The Războinicii tribe was announced by Pro TV on January 2, 2023.

Six contestants were added later in the game in both tribes.

Season summary

Nomination mechanism
The tribe(s) attend Tribal Council to nominate a certain number of players.
Cycle 1 - Cycle 4: There was only one Tribal Immunity Challenge, the losing tribe would have three nominees, one by vote and two chosen by the Individual Immunity winners.
Cycle 5: Two Tribal Immunity Challenges are performed, after each challenge the losing tribe must attend Tribal Council and nominate one of its members by vote. If the same tribe loses both challenges, the Immunity Necklace winners would nominate another member, for a total of three nominees.

Voting history

References

External links

Television shows filmed in the Dominican Republic
2022 Romanian television seasons
Romania